Blue States is an English electronic music group headed by Andy Dragazis. The band has been active since 1997, and is currently based in London, England. A track from their 2002 album Man Mountain, "Season Song", is featured on the soundtrack to the British horror film 28 Days Later. The album 'Restless Spheres' was released on 16 September 2016.

Discography
Nothing Changes Under the Sun (2000)
Man Mountain (2002)
The Soundings (2004)
First Steps Into... (2007)
Sum of the Parts (2009), a B-Sides collection 
Restless Spheres (2016)
World Contact Day (2022)

External links
Blue States official website
Blue States official Facebook page
Dragazis's website

Blue States on Allmusic

English electronic music groups
Trip hop groups
Memphis Industries artists